Christopher Sean Batton (born August 24, 1954) is a former professional baseball pitcher. He played part of one season in Major League Baseball for the Oakland Athletics.

Batton was drafted by the Athletics in the 12th round of the 1972 Major League Baseball Draft, and pitched in their organization through his major league debut in September 1976. He pitched two games for the A's with no decisions. The following spring he was traded to the Pittsburgh Pirates with Phil Garner and Tommy Helms to the Pittsburgh Pirates for Tony Armas, Rick Langford, Doug Bair, Dave Giusti, Doc Medich, and Mitchell Page. He never pitched in the major leagues again.

Batton's twin brother John pitched briefly in the minor leagues in the Minnesota Twins organization in 1974.

References

External links

Major League Baseball pitchers
Oakland Athletics players
Baseball players from Los Angeles
Coos Bay-North Bend A's players
Burlington Bees players
Birmingham A's players
Tucson Toros players
Santo Domingo Azucareros players
Shreveport Captains players
Columbus Clippers players
Bakersfield Outlaws players
1954 births
Living people